Robert Wayne "Bob" Birch (July 14, 1956 – August 15, 2012) was an American musician. He was primarily a session musician and sideman to a variety of notable artists.

Early life
At an early age, Birch was inspired to pursue music by his father Chet, an upright bassist. Birch began playing the alto saxophone, mirroring the styles of Paul Desmond and Cannonball Adderley. He learned quickly and was soon recognized by the Michigan School Band and Orchestra Association through his 1st-place finishes at music festival competitions. Around 7th grade, Birch tried out the electric bass, from his fascination for the Motown sound, as well as groups like Chicago, Blood, Sweat, and Tears, and the overall mesmerizing sound of the Fender bass coming across the radio waves. One day he picked up his junior high band director Art Dries's Mosrite bass during school lunch and something about it felt totally right. Because he also had a strong passion for the classical side of music, Birch focused his school studies on the bassoon. In high school, Birch played many instruments including sax, bass, as well as bassoon. As a senior in high school, he won the Louis Armstrong Jazz Award. He received a competitive scholarship from the state of Michigan to enroll in Wayne State University in Detroit as a pre-med major. Birch played six nights a week amidst the Detroit club scene while attending classes during the day. His love for music swayed him quickly from his initial major. Birch went on to graduate with a bachelor's degree in music education and performance from Wayne State.

Career
Soon after graduating from college, Birch joined a band with his brother Dan and sister-in-law Martha, becoming one of the top bands on the Detroit circuit. While performing at lounges in local hotels, Birch met many musicians from some of the top touring bands of the time including the Doobie Brothers, George Benson, Chicago and Barry Manilow. The conversations he had with these artists influenced him to decide to move to Los Angeles and take a stab at the big time music scene.

He arrived in Los Angeles in 1981, and struggled to make the contacts he needed, but meeting saxophonist Michael Paulo at the musician's union started things off for Birch. Michael invited Birch to his house to jam, and while there he met Akio Katsuyama, a jazz pianist from Osaka, Japan. Akio needed a bassist for his trio and hired Birch on the spot. The gig was an opportunity and learning experience for Birch. While they played together, Akio turned Birch onto the Watanabe method of jazz, and Birch helped Akio with his English. With his musical drive, Birch continued to look for other avenues of performance. He auditioned for and joined every band he could. His momentum continued to build as he was able to get hired for multiple recording dates. He started to get a small toe in the door of the L.A. music scene while doing every demo he could as well as playing with his long-time friend and established musician, drummer Gregg Bissonette, on a Jazzercise multi-platinum record. Finally, in 1985 he was involved in a record deal with a band named Fortune. Birch's good friend and mentor from Detroit, drummer Jimmy Hunter, recommended him to the band and soon after they signed a record deal with Camel/MCA. Their debut record with producer Kevin Beamish included the single "Stacey", on which Birch played bass and saxophone. "Stacey" made it on the Billboard Hot 100 singles list for six straight weeks. The record was stalled after three singles and Birch recognized that he needed to continue looking for other opportunities. He remained in the music scene by playing gigs every night and joining as many bands as possible. During this time, he was able to meet and play with L.A.'s finest musicians. A notable band he had joined at that time was with L.A. vocalist Rainey. Birch valued the friendship and camaraderie of every musician he met during this time.

Later in 1985, he met keyboardist Guy Babylon. They recorded together on the Luis Cardenas debut album, Animal Instinct, which went on to get a Grammy nomination. They made a great team together while playing with and recording for many artists. In 1988, Guy recommended Bob for Mark Ashton's band. Bob joined the band which included drummer Zak Starkey, and after a few showcases for record companies Ashton was signed by RCA. The debut album was recorded at A&M studios with the producer Paul Rothchild, who is most known for his work with The Doors. The album was initially highly acclaimed, but unfortunately it did not enjoy the needed commercial success. At that time, Guy Babylon was asked to join Elton John's band. Because Guy was involved with the Ashton band, he came to Bob asking what he should do. Bob responded with a convincing "What are you waiting for?", and Guy proceeded to leave Ashton and join John. Bob continued his search for more gigs and was fortunate to be hired by percussionist Bob Conti for a spot in Jose Feliciano's band. Bob was happy to join Feliciano, being a fan of his music and reminiscing on the fact that '"Light My Fire" was the first album he ever bought. He set off on a world tour with Feliciano which lasted four years. Bob had a blast and described Feliciano as a 'monster player' and the band as a 'great hang'. In between touring dates, Bob would return to Los Angeles and dig up more contacts which brought more gigs. Fate would soon shine down once again.

When Elton John ended his tour in 1989, Guy Babylon introduced Bob to John's longtime guitarist, Davey Johnstone. At that time, Davey, Guy, and longtime John drummer Nigel Olsson were about to make a record together and asked Bob to join them. They named their band Warpipes, and their album debuted in 1990. Everyone who heard the album loved it, but it was met with management and record company obstacles. The project stalled, and Guy and Davey were called to begin John's The One album in Paris. A bit discouraged but never losing his drive, Bob proceeded to once again hit the streets to find more playing opportunities. As 'The One' tour was about to begin, Elton asked bassist Pino Palladino to join him. Pino was forced to decline because his wife was scheduled to give birth. Elton asked Davey Johnstone if he knew any bassists who could fill the spot and Davey replied by saying, "We've been playing with this cat Bob Birch in LA. How about we give him a try?" On February 14, 1992, Elton agreed and asked Davey to call Bob, which began what the Detroit born bassist calls 'sideman heaven'. When asked about his new spot in Elton's group he always responded that he 'couldn't ask for a better gig'. Birch continued to respond after being asked about his feelings on joining Elton's band by stating, "Not only is the music fantastic, but the bass lines are classic and Elton is a gem. He is like family; I love him dearly and truly value our personal and musical relationship with all of my heart". Being Elton's touring and primary recording bassist obviously opened up more avenues for Birch in his musical career. Once again, in between gigs with Elton, Bob was back in L.A. looking for even more playing opportunities.

In 1993, he met musician and composer Marc Bonilla and was asked to join his band, 'The Dragonchoir' for the time he had between tours with Elton. Bob accepted, and with Marc he performed live and recorded with Keith Emerson, Steve Porcaro, Glenn Hughes, and Ronnie Montrose. He later played on Emerson's solo album, featuring Marc Bonilla, alongside Gregg Bissonette on drums. Birch teamed up with Bonilla on a few other works. Together they worked on a comedy album, Fuzzatonic Scream by Bobby Gaylor, which Bonilla produced. Also with Marc, along with studio pro Mike Mason, Bob played on the soundtracks of the movies The Replacements and The Scorpion King for Los Angeles film composer John Debney. Bonilla also gave Birch the chance to play with one of his favorite vocalists, David Coverdale, at Mark & Brian's Christmas show. Touring with Elton opened up continuous opportunities for Bob to expand his musical creativity.

Since Elton teamed up with Billy Joel for multiple tours which Birch was a part of, it give him the chance to hook up with Billy's saxophone player Mark Rivera. Mark and Bob quickly became good friends, and Bob was grateful for Mark asking him to be the primary bassist at one of the first Rock & Roll Fantasy Camps. The Camp allowed Birch the opportunity to perform with  Leslie West, Rick Derringer, Nils Lofgren, Mike Love, Lou Gramm, and as the third member of the 'Detroit Royalty' Grand Funk Railroad with Mark Farner and Don Brewer. Another memorable moment for Bob was when Rick Latham, drummer and friend of Bob's, gave him the chance to play with Edgar Winter and the White Trash featuring Rick Derringer reunion at the Montreux Jazz Festival in 1999.

While recording Made In England with John at Air Studios in London, Birch was sitting in the studio lobby reading a magazine during a break and he noticed a shadow blocking his light. As he looked up, he instantly recognized Beatles producer George Martin. George asked Bob if he "would be up for playing on a couple of tracks he was doing with chromatic harp ace Larry Adler's album The Glory of Gershwin. After Bob "picked his jaw off of the floor", he answered yes. Yet another highlight of his career was building a musical relationship with producer and songwriter David Harris. Harris asked Bob to play on Brian Doerksen's Juno Award winning album, which was put together with drummer Vinnie Colaiuta and Toto singer Joseph Williams. That led to the opportunity to co-write as well as play on a song for Joseph Williams' solo album, This Fall. Bob said that "being a huge Toto fan, it was an honor to be involved with Joseph. Seeing my name on an album alongside my all-time heroes David Paich, Steve Lukather, Steve Porcaro, and Bobby Kimball was obviously an added rush".

Injury
In 1995, Birch was badly injured in a car accident in which he was hit by a pick-up truck while walking the streets of Montreal with his fellow band members. After being hit, he was thrown over twenty feet before landing on the asphalt, breaking both his legs as well as severely damaging his back and spine. The doctors initially told him that he would never walk again, but within six months he was back on tour with Elton John, and continued to do so for the next seventeen years. Throughout those years, Birch struggled with constant headaches, dizziness, vertigo, and severe pain throughout his body. According to friend and colleague Nigel Olsson, he saw "hundreds of physicians, but nothing could reverse the damage which was already done. His entire body was knackered.". During his final tour before his death, Birch was forced to perform while seated on a chair because of the pain he was enduring, which had been aggravated by a fall accident at the start of the tour.

Death 
During the last two weeks leading up to his death, Birch struggled with severe gastrointestinal issues brought on by his injury, losing over 23 pounds in this short period of time. On August 15, 2012, he died from an apparent self-inflicted gunshot wound in his Los Angeles home, aged 56. The subsequent autopsy revealed an amount of damage and scar tissue through his back and neck which is usually only seen in those who are disabled.

References

External links
 Bob Birch Songs, Albums, Reviews, Bio & More
 Elton John: News: Article
 Elton John: News: Article
 Elton John — Vancouver Plus.ca
 36 years of eltonjohnallsongslist

1956 births
2012 deaths
American male composers
American session musicians
Wayne State University alumni
American rock bass guitarists
Suicides by firearm in California
20th-century American bass guitarists
21st-century American bass guitarists
Guitarists from Detroit
American male bass guitarists
20th-century American composers
20th-century American male musicians
20th-century British male musicians
21st-century American male musicians
Elton John Band members
2012 suicides